OMP may refer to:
 OMP Racing, an Italian manufacturer of racing car equipment
 Ontario Model Parliament, a model parliament for high school students in Canada
 OpenMP, an application programming interface
 Oregon Mozart Players, a professional chamber orchestra based in Eugene, Oregon
 Online marketing platform, an integrated set of web-based marketing tools
 Ośrodek Myśli Politycznej, Polish think tank
 Orthogonal matching pursuit
 Organic micropollutant
 Overlay Management Protocol, network protocol in Cisco SD-WAN products

Biology

 Orotidine monophosphate, a nucleotide
 Osteoblast milk protein, a milk additive
 Outer membrane proteins, found in the outer membranes of gram-negative bacteria
 Oral Micronized Progesterone